USCGC Mellon (WHEC-717) was the third United States Coast Guard Hamilton-class high endurance cutter constructed. The 2,748-ton cutter’s ocean crossing range was 10,000 miles at 20 knots.

Mellon was laid down on 25 July 1966 at Avondale Shipyards near New Orleans, Louisiana. She was named for Andrew W. Mellon, the 49th U.S. Secretary of the Treasury from 1921-1932, and launched on 11 February 1967 by Mrs. John W. Warner, Jr., sponsor and granddaughter of the late Secretary Andrew Mellon. Mellon was commissioned 9 January 1968.

Mellon was built with a welded steel hull and aluminum superstructure. She was one of the first naval vessels built with a combined diesel and gas turbine propulsion plant. Her twin screws can use 7,000 diesel shaft horsepower to make 17 knots, and a total of 36,000 gas turbine shaft horsepower to make 28 knots. The two diesel engines are Fairbanks-Morse and are larger versions of their 1968 diesel locomotive design. Her two Pratt-Whitney marine gas turbine engines are similar to those installed in Boeing 707 passenger jet aircraft. The Hamilton-class cutters were among the first American vessels to use jet aircraft-type turbines for propulsion.

Operational history
USCGC Mellon was originally homeported in Honolulu, Hawaii. Mellon saw extensive service during the conflict in Vietnam. She was twice awarded the Meritorious Unit Commendation during the Vietnam War. During her service in the waters adjacent to Vietnam, Mellon conducted numerous naval gunfire support missions, rescue operations, medical civic action programs, and training programs for Vietnamese military personnel. In March 1970, Mellon was involved in pursuit of mutineers involved in the SS Columbia Eagle incident during the Vietnam War.

Upon returning from Vietnam, Mellon’s primary theater of operation shifted to an area of the Pacific Ocean known as "Ocean Station November." Here she performed search and rescue and oceanographic research missions. Coast Guard cutters conducting Ocean Station operations were a primary communication link for commercial aircraft making trans-oceanic flights in the era before satellite communications and satellite GPS navigation. By the mid-1970s, Mellon’s primary area of operation shifted northward to the icy waters of the Gulf of Alaska and the Bering Sea.

In February 1974, Mellon played a major role rescuing the crew of the empty Italian ore-bulk-oil carrier Giovanna Lolli-Ghetti. They survived a series of explosions, fire, and then sinking of the combination carrier within three hours. At midnight Mellon was advised of a distress call from 900 miles northeast of Hawaii. At roughly 1115 hrs the next morning, Mellon reached the area where the vessel Tamerlane (Norway) was rescuing survivors from the now deserted tanker.

The survivors transferred to Mellon for medical treatment, warm food and clean clothes. The nearby Novikov Priboy from Russia arrived to give additional medical aid. Seven of the crew were not recovered. Two survivors with severe burns were airlifted off Mellon by a USCG Sikorsky HH-52 Seaguard helicopter carried out and flown off the Australian light aircraft carrier HMAS Melbourne. The rest were taken back to Honolulu on Mellon.

In October 1980, Mellon assisted in the rescue of 520 passengers and crew of the MS Prinsendam, a 427 foot long luxury cruise liner in distress in the Gulf Of Alaska when fire broke out in her engine room. The vessel’s master declared the fire out of control after an hour and ordered the vessel abandoned. Most of the passengers and crew made it into lifeboats, while some were left on board. Eventually all the lifeboats and all passengers and crew were found and recovered with no deaths or serious injuries. After the rescue operations were completed, the Mellon remained on scene in a futile attempt to fight the fire that had originated in the Prinsendam engine room and progressed throughout the ship. While the Prinsendam was under tow by salvage tugs, and escorted by Mellon, the burning ship suddenly listed hard over to port and sank within a few minutes.

In 1981, Mellon moved to her new homeport of Seattle, Washington.

Mellon was modernized from 1985 to 1989 during the Fleet Rehabilitation and Modernization (FRAM) program. She and a portion of the Hamilton-class were outfitted with all-weather, over-the-horizon RGM-84 Harpoon anti-ship missiles, and test firings of the harpoon were conducted on the Mellon in January 1990. At least three WHEC cutters, the USCGC Hamilton, USCGC Morgenthau, and USCGC Mellon, were equipped with Harpoon missiles.

All Hamilton-class cutters also carried an ASW suite that was upgraded during FRAM, this included MK 32 Mod 7 Surface Vessel Torpedo Tubes, AN/SQS-38 sonar,  Mk-309 Mod 0 Underwater Battery Fire Control System, and AN/SLQ-25 (NIXIE) torpedo countermeasures. After the collapse of the Soviet Union, the joint Navy/USCG board decided there was no military threat to require the installation of anti-ship missiles and anti-submarine weapons on board cutters, and subsequently removed the weapons. However the fitting and firing of Harpoons on these cutters served as a proof of capability for all Hamilton-class USCG cutters.

Trivia
In the 1980 Disney film The Last Flight of Noah's Ark, the Mellon found and rescued the crew of an airplane that had been converted into a makeshift life raft.

Gallery

References

External links

USCGC Mellon Home Page

Ships of the United States Coast Guard
Hamilton-class cutters
Ships built in Bridge City, Louisiana
1967 ships